Michail Yuryevich Tsarev (born June 22, 1986) is a Russian mixed martial artist former fighter in the welterweight division for the Bellator Fighting Championships.

Mixed martial arts career

Early career
Tsarev made his professional debut in October 2005. Tsarev trains with Andrey Koreshkov, Alexander Sarnavskiy, Bellator veteran Alexander Shlemenko and with Sambo World Champion Vener Galiev.

His biggest victory to date was against American MMA fighter Kyacey Uscola via submission (triangle choke) in first round.

Bellator Fighting Championships
In August 2012, it was announced that Tsarev would make his U.S. debut for Bellator Fighting Championships.

Tsarev faced Tim Welch on September 28, 2012 at Bellator 74.  This was the opening round of the season seven Welterweight tournament. He won via submission in the second round.  He faced Lyman Good in the semifinals on October 26, 2012 at Bellator 78.  He lost via controversial TKO in the second round as Tsarev said he had been poked in the right eye, but referee Greg Franklin did not acknowledge it.

Tsarev faced Douglas Lima in welterweight tournament on January 24, 2013 at Bellator 86 on Spike TV. He lost the fight via TKO due to brutal leg kicks in the second round.

Konfrontacja Sztuk Walki
Michail Tsarev is expected to face KSW welterweight champion Borys Mańkowski on February 21, 2015 at KSW 30. However, Tsarev pulled out of the fight in late-February citing an injury and was replaced by Norway's Mohsen Bahari.

League S-70
Tsarev faced to Jesse Taylor on August 29, 2015 at League S-70: Russia vs. World. He lost the fight via submission (guillotine choke) in the first round.

Absolute Championship Berkut
Tsarev faced Albert Duraev for the ACB Welterweight belt on May 6, 2016, but he lost the fight via KO (punches) at the ACB 45: In Memory of Guram Gugenishvili in the first round.

Tsarev faced Shamil Abdulkhalikov on October 22, 2016 at ACB 48. He won the fight via submission in the first round.

Championships and accomplishments

Pankration
Russian Pankration Federation
Pankration Russian National Champion

Hand-to-hand combat
Russian Union of Martial Arts
Hand-to-hand fight Russian National Champion

Personal life
Tsarev has wife Inna.

Mixed martial arts record

|-
|Loss
|align=center|33–9
|Vladimir Vasilyev
|TKO (punches)
|Open Fighting Championship 21 
|
|align=center|2
|align=center|3:50
|Saint Petersburg, Russia
|
|-
|Win
|align=center|33–8
|Vladimir Ivashkin
|Submission (kimura)
|Open Fighting Championship 17
|
|align=center|2
|align=center|2:58
|Barnaul, Russia
|
|-
|Loss
|align=center|32–8
|Sergei Martynov
|TKO (punches)
|RCC: Intro 9
|
|align=center|1
|align=center|1:55
|Ekaterinburg, Russia
|
|-
|Win
|align=center|32–7
|Artur Guseinov
|TKO (punches and elbows)
|Fight Nights Global 78: Tsarev vs. Guseinov
|
|align=center| 1
|align=center| 4:26
|Samara, Russia
|
|-
|Loss
|align=center|31–7
|Piotr Strus
|TKO (doctor stopage)
| |ACB 53: Young Eagles 15
|
|align=center| 2
|align=center| 5:00
|Olsztyn, Poland
|
|-
|Win
|align=center|31–6
|Shamil Abdulkhalikov
|Submission (triangle choke)
| |ACB 48: Revenge
|
|align=center| 1
|align=center| 1:32
|Moscow, Russia
|
|-
|Loss
|align=center|30–6
|Albert Duraev
|KO (punches)
|ACB 35: In Memory of Guram Gugenishvili
|
|align=center| 1
|align=center| 2:45
|Tbilisi, Georgia
|
|-
|Win
|align=center|30–5
|Artem Reznikov
|Submission (guillotine choke)
|Tech-Krep FC: Battle in Siberia
|
|align=center| 1
|align=center| 0:40
|Novosibirsk, Russia
|
|-
|Loss
|align=center|29–5
|Jesse Taylor
|Submission (guillotine choke)
|League S-70: Russia vs. World
|
|align=center| 1
|align=center| 0:40
|Sochi, Krasnodar krai, Russia
|
|-
|Win
|align=center|29–4
|Dennis Hallman
|TKO (punches)
|ProFC 56
|
|align=center| 1
|align=center| 2:45
|Kaliningrad, Kaliningrad oblast, Russia
|
|-
|Win
|align=center|28–4
|Xavier Foupa-Pokam
|TKO (punches)
|FEFoMP: Mayor Cup 2014
|
|align=center| 1
|align=center| 4:56
|Khabarovsk, Khabarovsk Krai, Russia
|
|-
|Win
|align=center|27–4
|Charles Andrade
|TKO (body kick)
|ProFC 51
|
|align=center| 1
|align=center| 3:35
|Kaliningrad, Kaliningrad oblast, Russia
|
|-
|Win
|align=center|26–4
|Robert Sarkozi
|TKO (punches)
|White Rex: The Birth of a Nation
|
|align=center| 1
|align=center| 2:06
|Moscow, Moscow oblast, Russia
|
|-
|Win
|align=center|25–4
|Jaime Jara
|TKO (punches)
|League S-70: Plotforma
|
|align=center| 1
|align=center| 0:39
|Sochi, Krasnodar krai, Russia
|
|-
|Loss
|align=center|24–4
|Douglas Lima
|TKO (leg kicks)
|Bellator 86
|
|align=center| 2
|align=center| 1:44
|Thackerville, Oklahoma, United States
|
|-
|Loss
|align=center|24–3
|Lyman Good
|TKO (punches)
|Bellator 78
|
|align=center|2
|align=center|3:54
|Dayton, Ohio, United States
|
|-
|Win
|align=center|24–2
|Tim Welch
|Submission (rear-naked choke)
|Bellator 74
|
|align=center|2
|align=center|1:57
|Atlantic City, New Jersey, United States
|
|-
|Win
|align=center|23–2
|Kyacey Uscola
|Submission (triangle choke)
|BF - Baltic Challenge 3
|
|align=center|1
|align=center|1:12
|Kaliningrad, Kaliningrad Oblast, Russia
|
|-
|Win
|align=center|22–2
|Rasul Magamedov
|Submission (triangle choke)
|League S-70 - Russian Championship Second Round
|
|align=center|1
|align=center|3:22
|Omsk, Omsk Oblast, Russia
|
|-
|Win
|align=center|21–2
|Deyan Topalski
|KO (head kick)
|Union of Veterans of Sport - Russia vs. Europe
|
|align=center|1
|align=center|0:15
|Novosibirsk, Novosibirsk Oblast, Russia
|
|-
|Win
|align=center|20–2
|Abdulsupyan Alikhanov
|TKO (pucnhes)
|ProFC: Battle on the Caucasus
|
|align=center|1
|align=center|N\A
|Khasavyurt, Republic of Dagestan, Russia
|
|-
|Win
|align=center|19–2
|Shamil Abdulkhalikov
|Submission (rear-naked choke)
|Pankration Cup of Call: Siberia vs. Caucasus
|
|align=center|1
|align=center|3:21
|Omsk, Omsk Oblast, Russia
|
|-
|Win
|align=center|18–2
|Shamil Abdulkhalikov
|Submission (armbar)
|ProFC 22
|
|align=center|2
|align=center|2:30
|Rostov-on-Don, Rostov Oblast, Russia
|
|-
|Win
|align=center|17–2
|Bagautdin Sharaputdinov
|Submission (triangle choke)
|rowspan=2|ProFC 21
|rowspan=2|
|align=center|1
|align=center|1:50
|rowspan=2|Ufa, Republic of Bashkortostan, Russia
|
|-
|Win
|align=center|16–2
|Omari Akhmedov
|Submission (guillotine choke)
|align=center|2
|align=center|4:29
|
|-
|Win
|align=center|15–2
|Magomed Eldiev
|Technical Submission (triangle choke)
|Golden Fist Russia
|
|align=center|2
|align=center|0:41
|Moscow, Moscow Oblast, Russia
|
|-
|Win
|align=center|14–2
|Sergey Naumov
|Submission (rear-naked choke)
|Siberian League: Siberia vs. Ural
|
|align=center|1
|align=center|0:56
|Novokuznetsk, Kemerovo Oblast, Russia
|
|-
|Loss
|align=center|13–2
|Gustavo Picone
|Submission (rear-naked choke)
|IAFC: Russia vs. the World
|
|align=center|1
|align=center|2:25
|Novosibirsk, Novosibirsk, Russia
|
|-
|Loss
|align=center|13–1
|Gadji Zaipulaev
|Submission (choke)
|Siberian Challenge 2
|
|align=center|1
|align=center|N/A
|Bratsk, Irkutsk Oblast, Russia
|
|-
|Win
|align=center|13–0
|Pavel Semenov
|Submission (rear-naked choke)
|WUFC: Championship of Siberia in Pankration
|
|align=center|1
|align=center|1:02
|Berdsk, Novosibirsk Oblast, Russia
|
|-
|Win
|align=center|12–0
|Maxim Motodoev
|KO (punch)
|Siberian Challenge 1
|
|align=center|1
|align=center|N/A
|Brats, Irkutsk Oblast, Russia
|
|-
|Win
|align=center|11–0
|Pavel Kuchumov
|Decision (unanimous)
|WUFC: Championship of Siberia in Pankration
|
|align=center|2
|align=center|5:00
|Mezhdurechensk, Kemerovo Oblast, Russia
|
|-
|Win
|align=center|10–0
|Karen Avetisyan
|Submission (armbar)
|WUFC: Russia vs. USA
|
|align=center|1
|align=center|0:56
|Barnaul, Altai Krai, Russia
|
|-
|Win
|align=center|9–0
|Edgar Kolyan
|Submission (choke)
|WUFC: Resistance
|
|align=center|N/A
|align=center|N/A
|Novosibirsk, Novosibirsk Oblast, Russia
|
|-
|Win
|align=center|8–0
|Denis Evseev
|Submission (armbar)
|rowspan=2|WUFC: Championship of Russia in Professional Pankration
|rowspan=2|
|align=center|1
|align=center|1:10
|rowspan=2|Novosibirsk, Novosibirsk Oblast, Russia
|
|-
|Win
|align=center|7–0
|Kardash Fatakhov
|Submission (armbar)
|align=center|1
|align=center|3:00
|
|-
|Win
|align=center|6–0
|Yuri Folomkin
|Decision (unanimous)
|rowspan=2|WUFC - Gladiators Challenge 4th Stage
|rowspan=2|
|align=center|2
|align=center|5:00
|rowspan=2|Novosibirsk, Novosibirsk Oblast, Russia
|
|-
|Win
|align=center|5–0
|Vladimir Startsev
|Submission (guillotine choke)
|align=center|1
|align=center|1:13
|
|-
|Win
|align=center|4–0
|Igor Bayer
|Submission (rear-naked choke)
|rowspan=2|WUFC: Championship of Novosibirsk in Professional Pankration
|rowspan=2|
|align=center|1
|align=center|4:55
|rowspan=2|Novosibirsk, Novosibirsk Oblast, Russia
|
|-
|Win
|align=center|3–0
|Alexey Pavlov
|Submission (guillotine choke)
|align=center|1
|align=center|0:45
|
|-
|Win
|align=center|2–0
|Gennady Karnaukhov
|Submission (armbar)
|WUFC: Gladiators Challenge 2nd Stage
|
|align=center|1
|align=center|6:12
|Krasnoyarsk, Krasnoyarsk Krai, Russia
|
|-
|Win
|align=center|1–0
|Ruslan Magomedov
|Submission (armbar)
|WUFC: Gladiators Challenge 1st Stage
|
|align=center|1
|align=center|1:05
|Krasnoyarsk, Krasnoyarsk Krai, Russia
|

References

External links

Living people
Russian male mixed martial artists
Welterweight mixed martial artists
1986 births
Flyweight mixed martial artists
Mixed martial artists utilizing sambo
Mixed martial artists utilizing pankration
Mixed martial artists utilizing ARB
Mixed martial artists utilizing Brazilian jiu-jitsu
Russian sambo practitioners
Russian practitioners of Brazilian jiu-jitsu
Sportspeople from Novosibirsk